Billy Kahora is a Kenyan writer and editor based in Nairobi. He was commended by the 2007 Caine Prize judges for his story Treadmill Love. His stories Urban Zoning and Gorilla’s Apprentice were shortlisted for the prize in 2012 and 2014, respectively. He is the author of works including the non-fiction book The True Story of David Munyakei (2008), wrote the screenplay for Soul Boy (2010) and co-wrote Nairobi Half Life (2012). As Managing Editor of Kwani Trust, Kahora has edited seven issues of the Kwani? journal. He is a contributing editor to the Chimurenga Chronic.

Published works

Further reading

References

External links

 Billy Kahora, "A fine intuition", Writers Mosaic.
 "Conversation/Kōrero: Robert Sullivan and Billy Kahora", Academy of New Zealand Literature, April and May 2017.

Alumni of the University of Edinburgh
International Writing Program alumni
Kenyan male writers
Kenyan writers
Living people
Rhodes University alumni
Year of birth missing (living people)